This page provides the summaries of the matches of the qualifying rounds for the group stage of the 2009 CAF Champions League.

Preliminary round
In this round the 42 teams that did not receive byes to the First Round were randomly drawn against each other.

The matches were held between 30 January 2009 and 15 February 2009. The 21 winners advanced to the First Round held in March 2009.

Primeiro de Agosto won 7 – 3 on aggregate and advanced to the First Round.

Canon Yaoundé won 2 – 1 on aggregate and advanced to the First Round.

AS Douanes won 4 – 1 on aggregate and advanced to the First Round.

Kano Pillars won 2 – 0 on aggregate and advanced to the First Round.

Club Africain advanced to the First Round after Sporting Clube de Bafatá withdrew.

Djoliba won 4 – 1 on aggregate and advanced to the First Round.

Kampala City Council FC won 3 – 2 on aggregate and advanced to the First Round.

Supersport United won 8 – 2 on aggregate and advanced to the First Round.

Heartland won 10 – 1 on aggregate and advanced to the First Round.

FAR Rabat won 6 – 2 on aggregate and advanced to the First Round.

Petro de Luanda won 6 – 0 on aggregate and advanced to the First Round.

Etoile Filante Ouagadougou won 4 – 3 on aggregate and advanced to the First Round.

Al Ahly won 7 – 2 on aggregate and advanced to the First Round.

Ittihad Khemisset advanced to the First Round after Wallidan Football Club withdrew.

ASO Chlef won 3 – 1 on aggregate and advanced to the First Round.

AS Mangasport won 3 – 1 on aggregate and advanced to the First Round.

Monomotapa United F.C. won 3 – 2 on aggregate and advanced to the First Round.

Young Africans won 14 – 1 on aggregate and advanced to the First Round.

US Stade Tamponnaise won 6 – 0 and advanced to the First Round.

Played as a single match after the scheduled first leg was cancelled due to political violence in Madagascar

ZESCO United F.C. won 5 – 1 on aggregate and advanced to the First Round.

Al-Merreikh won 2 – 1 on aggregate and advanced to the First Round.

Dispensation Round
Two federations inscribed their clubs after the deadline, but were admitted for an intermediate round. However, the winning club could only gain access to the first round if another winning club from the preliminary round withdrew subsequently.

1 – 1 on aggregate after extra time; Akonangui FC won 5 – 4 on penalty kicks.  However, as no victorious side withdrew from the tournament, Akonangui did not advance to the first round.

First round
This a knock-out stage of 32 teams; the 21 teams advancing from the preliminary round, and 11 teams that received byes to this round.

1 – 1 on aggregate after extra time; C.D. Primeiro de Agosto won 5 – 4 on penalty kicks and advanced to the Second Round.

Aggregate score 1 – 1.  Kano Pillars F.C. advanced to the Second Round on the away goals rule.

Aggregate score 2 – 2.  Djoliba AC advanced to the Second Round on the away goals rule.

Kampala City Council FC won 3 – 2 on aggregate and advanced to the Second Round.

 

Heartland F.C. won 4 – 2 on aggregate and advanced to the Second Round.

TP Mazembe won 5 – 1 on aggregate and advanced to the Second Round.

ASEC Mimosas won 3 – 0 on aggregate and advanced to the Second Round.

Al Ahly Tripoli won 3 – 1 on aggregate and advanced to the Second Round.

Aggregate score 3 – 3.  Ittihad Khemisset advanced to the Second Round on the away goals rule.

Étoile Sportive du Sahel won 2 – 1 on aggregate and advanced to the Second Round.

Cotonsport won 5 – 3 on aggregate and advanced to the Second Round.

Aggregate score 4 – 4.  Monomotapa United advanced to the Second Round on the away goals rule.

Al Ahly won 4 – 0 on aggregate and advanced to the Second Round.

Al-Hilal won 4 – 3 on aggregate and advanced to the Second Round.

ZESCO United F.C. won 2 – 0 on aggregate and advanced to the Second Round.

Al-Merreikh won 4 – 1 on aggregate and advanced to the Second Round.

Second round
This is a knock-out stage of 16 teams that advanced from the first round; winners will advance to the group stage, with the losers advancing to the CAF Confederation Cup.

The first leg will be on 17–19 April and the second leg on 1–3 May.

Aggregate score 3–3.  Al-Hilal advanced to the Group Stage on the away goals rule.

Aggregate score 3–3.  Kano Pillars advanced to the Group Stage on the away goals rule.

ZESCO United won 2–1 on aggregate and advanced to the Group Stage

Al-Merreikh won 2–1 on aggregate and advanced to the Group Stage

Heartland won 3–2 on aggregate and advanced to the Group Stage.

TP Mazembe won 1–0 on aggregate and advanced to the Group Stage

Monomotapa United won 2–1 on aggregate and advanced to the Group Stage

Étoile Sportive du Sahel won 2–0 on aggregate and advanced to the Group Stage

References

External links
 Results and fixtures

Qualifying rounds